Kastoria National Airport (also known as Aristotelis Airport)  is an airport in Argos Orestiko at the regional unit of Kastoria, Macedonia, Greece.

Airlines and destinations
The following airlines operate regular scheduled and charter flights at Kastoria National Airport:

Statistics

See also
Transport in Greece

References

Airports in Greece
Kastoria